Nuel is a village in Kermanshah Province, Iran.

Nuel may also refer to:
Jean-Pierre Nuel (1847–1920), Luxembourgian ophthalmologist
Nuel Belnap (born 1930), American logician